This is a comprehensive list of works by author Kristen Ashley, including anthologies co-authored with others and self-published short works.

Bibliography

Single novels

Mathilda, SuperWitch

Rock Chick

Colorado Mountain

Dream Man

Dream Team series

Chaos

Unfinished Hero

The 'Burg

Magdalene

Three Wishes

Ghosts and Reincarnation

Fantasyland

The Rising

The Three

Honey

Loose Ends

Moonlight & Motor Oil

River Rain series

Anthologies

Short works
 Rock Chick
 "Rock Chick Redux"
 "How to be a Rock Chick"
 "A Rock Chick Valentine"
 Chaos
 "He's Safe in My Hands"
 "Kit and Hound do Tequila"
 "More Pleasure than Pain"
 "Merry and Bright - An Elvira Christmas Story"
 "You Did It, Baby"

References 

Ashley, Kristen